Mobile procurement is mobile business software that helps organizations streamline their procurement process from a mobile device. Features of mobile procurement software include mobile purchase order creation, on-demand notifications, and real-time analytics. What makes mobile procurement successful is the ability to leverage software-side servers to move data along. The key benefit for organizations using mobile procurement systems is the ability to track business operations using any ordinary mobile device.

Mobile procurement software is generally represented in the form of custom applications provided as an add-on feature of a larger enterprise resource planning software solution. As such, if the goal of a mobile procurement system should be to complement existing information systems, mobile procurement software should typically involve the needs of procurement professionals before implementation. Assuring that necessary features are prioritized over having many features is key to successful user adoption.

It also simplifies order management processes by removing the confusion and disorder often seen with paper-based procurement. Mobile procurement provides a clearer view of the steps behind procurement and give companies the insight needed to consistently secure the best possible total cost of ownership.

Mobile Enterprise Applications
Mobile enterprise application software is the use of office software applications on a mobile platform in a way that adapts to different devices and networks. Many organizations use these applications to increase employee productivity and streamline business operations.

The first common mobile enterprise application was the implementation of email. Now, 53% of emails  are opened on a mobile device, a 45% increase in three years. The next wave of popular mobile enterprise application software was the advent of the CRM software. This allows salespeople to stay up-to-date with the business and manage customer relationships crucial to success from anywhere.

Another enterprise software application being leveraged on a mobile platform is procurement. This trend is led by the consumer shopping experience. Over 36% of online sales on Black Friday in 2015 came from mobile shopping, according to IBM. As more shoppers are migrating to mobile applications, procurement departments need to keep up with user preferences. This mobile platform provides capabilities to complete the procurement process from start to finish. This includes searching for items and services, comparing vendors and prices, submitting purchase requests, approving requests, electronic signing, purchase orders and invoicing. Being able to accomplish this all in one place from any device significantly streamlines business procurement and operations.

Users leverage mobile procurement for various reasons, and the tool can benefit businesses in many ways.

User Convenience
The clear advantage of using mobile procurement is the ability to use it anywhere from any device. This eliminates interruptions in the process or the need to complete a request from a single device. Users can search, compare and request items from anywhere. Suppliers can receive and sign purchase orders electronically. Checking inventory levels of physical locations provides a strong utility for mobile procurement. 

Save Time
Mobile procurement saves time by reducing approval cycle time. A manager can make approvals from anywhere, not just his office. Users can request things they need when they need it, instead of after the fact, breaking corporate policy. Procurement now fills idle time rather than being a major item on a to-do list. This keeps employees and business moving forward. A fast procurement turnaround increases outcomes.

Visibility
Full visibility of suppliers and information helps businesses make informed decisions for better results and quicker processes. User analytics also help companies shop smarter in the long run.

Native Apps vs. HTML5
Mobile interaction now exceeds desktop Web interaction by 9%. Now that mobile is the dominant form of online activity, mobile procurement is simply a natural step into today’s digital landscape. Mobile procurement platforms can be approached in two ways: native apps or Web apps using HTML5.

Native Apps
A native app is a mobile application developed specifically for use on mobile devices, launched directly from the home screen. In the United States, use of mobile apps greatly exceeds use of mobile Web browsing, but that trend is not worldwide.

Using a native app requires development for all operating systems and brands. A fully operational native app needs to be designed for iOS, Android, Microsoft, all their various generations, and at different resolutions and orientations. For total success of an app, users will expect it to work on everything from a high-resolution tablet down to an Apple Watch.

The other factor to consider with native apps is the way they access backend data. This is often more complex than a simple push to read data that takes place on a Web browser. Apps are developed, depending on their purpose and functionality, to access other applications such as the camera or local storage.

Native apps can be the preferred use of mobile procurement in environments with either no IT access or highly secure networks. Financial institutions value privacy and security when considering mobile tools operating in their network. Oil and gas environments are often remote and require apps that can work with limited Internet access.

A downside to mobile apps is the memory they occupy on a device. Because of this, many businesses will steer away from apps that require a great deal of storage.

Web Apps and HTML5 
A Web app is run by a browser and is really a responsive Web site. Responsive sites change and adapt to any digital environment, including operating system, screen size and orientation. This has several advantages for mobile procurement platforms.

Responsive design can adjust to any browser on any device. The design is such that images, text, and user experience adjust based on the size and resolution of the platform. Adaptive web design is based on predetermined parameters for each platform. Both are ideal for any business that plans on interacting with customers on any type of mobile device.

HTML, JavaScript and CSS3 seamlessly integrate backend systems with browsers and user interfaces. This creates an easy-to-use experience for all users on any device. Although some designs are scaled down, which can limit functionality, responsive and adaptive web design is easily accessible for any customer. And functionality is all about priority. If a scaled down site still performs the necessary functions, users will still find the advantages of increased turnarounds and time saving.

The widespread availability of Wi-Fi increases the availability of HTML5 sites, reducing concerns about accessibility. With Wi-Fi everywhere, mobile procurement can happen in any place on a responsive site.

Elegantly designed responsive and adaptive sites are the ideal solution for mobile procurement because of the simplicity of creating and implementing one. If a user’s experience is smooth and consistent, they will have no problem accessing a mobile procurement platform from any device. With the advancement of tools and technology it is currently possible to provide a native feel and minimal native feature set to your mobile products. Examples would be AngularJS, which allows for rapid web app development while preserving quality.

References

E-commerce
Procurement
Mobile technology